Rayane Aabid (born 19 January 1992) is a French professional footballer who plays as a midfielder for Turkish club Kasımpaşa SK.

Professional career
Aabid signed for Paris FC on 23 June 2017, after a meteoric rise from the lower French divisions. Aabid made his professional debut with Paris FC in a 0–0 Ligue 2 tie with Clermont Foot on 28 July 2017.

Personal life
Born in France, Aabid is of Moroccan descent.

References

External links
 
 
 L'Equipe Profile
 Paris FC Profile

1992 births
Living people
People from Villeneuve-d'Ascq
French footballers
French sportspeople of Moroccan descent
Paris FC players
AS Béziers (2007) players
Championnat National 2 players
Championnat National players
Ligue 2 players
Association football forwards
Sportspeople from Nord (French department)
Footballers from Hauts-de-France
Hatayspor footballers
French expatriate footballers
French expatriate sportspeople in Turkey
Expatriate footballers in Turkey